Al-Arien  is a Syrian village located in Jisr al-Shughur Nahiyah in Jisr al-Shughur District, Idlib.  According to the Syria Central Bureau of Statistics (CBS), Al-Arien had a population of 663 in the 2004 census.

References 

Populated places in Jisr al-Shughur District